is a Japanese manufacturer of billiards and pool cue tips.  Originally fabricated by hand by founder Hideo Moori in his home outside Tokyo, they are now produced in a factory. The tips are exclusively made from vegetable-tanned pig skin, and consist of several thin layers bonded with an adhesive.

Moori was among the first to use a lamination technique to make a cue tip.  Moori tips received their first major exposure during the WPA World Nine-ball Championship in October 1994, and prompted many other companies to begin manufacturing layered tips.

Currently, Moori makes tips in three degrees of hardness: slow (soft), medium, and quick (hard).

References

Cue sports equipment manufacturers
Manufacturing companies based in Tokyo
1983 establishments in Japan
Manufacturing companies established in 1983